HD 222155 is a star in the northern constellation of Andromeda. It is a yellow star that can be viewed with binoculars or a small telescope, but is too faint to be seen with the naked eye at an apparent visual magnitude of 7.1. The imaging survey in 2017 did not detect any stellar companions to HD 222155.

This is an old main sequence star with a stellar classification of G0V; a star that is nearing an exhaustion of its hydrogen fuel. It is already beginning to expand its gaseous envelope, having radius of 1.85. The star is relatively depleted of heavy elements, having about 80% of solar abundance, and has weak yet noticeable ultraviolet flare activity.

Planetary system
Based on radial velocity data gathered in 2007-2011, the discovery of a superjovian planet b outside the habitable zone was announced in May 2012. The stellar and planetary parameters were refined in 2016. In 2023, the inclination and true mass of HD 222155 b were measured via astrometry.

References 

G-type main-sequence stars
Planetary systems with one confirmed planet
Andromeda (constellation)
Durchmusterung objects
222155
116616
J23380027+4859475